The 38th Field Artillery Regiment is a field artillery regiment of the United States Army.

History
On August 17, 1918, the 38th Field Artillery was organized as a regiment at Camp Lewis, Washington.  It trained at that station until February 10, 1919, when the regiment was demobilized.  Subsequently, on October 1, 1933, the 38th Field Artillery Regiment was reconstituted as an inactive unit of the regular Army.

The 38th Field Artillery next appears as a part of the Second Infantry Division.  On October 10, 1939, the Fifteenth Field Artillery Regiment at Fort Sam Houston, Texas, was re-organized and given a 3rd battalion.  Now, however, began the Army's program of modernization, which involved triangularization of the infantry division.  in accordance with this program, the Fifteenth's 3rd Battalion was reconstituted as the Thirty-eighth Field Artillery Battalion on October 1, 1940.

Distinctive unit insignia
Description
A gold color metal and enamel device 1 3/16 inches (3.02 cm) in height overall consisting of the shield, crest and motto of the coat of arms. 
Symbolism
The shield is red for Artillery. The three pallets and eight shells indicate the numerical designation and character of the organization, while the peak of Mt. Rainier and the lone star appearing on the crest refer respectively to the locations where the organization was organized and reactivated. 
Background
The distinctive unit insignia was originally approved for the 38th Field Artillery Battalion on 8 July 1941. It was redesignated for the 38th Artillery Regiment on 24 October 1958. The insignia was redesignated for the 38th Field Artillery Regiment effective 1 September 1971.

Coat of arms
Blazon
Shield
Gules, three pallets accosted by eight shells Or. 
Crest
On a wreath of the colors Or and Gules the peak of Mt. Rainier Proper charged with a mullet Gules. 
Motto
STEEL BEHIND THE ROCK. 
Symbolism
Shield
The shield is red for Artillery. The three pallets and eight shells indicate the numerical designation and character of the organization. 
Crest
The peak of Mt. Rainier and the lone star appearing on the crest refer respectively to the locations where the organization was organized and reactivated. 
Background
The coat of arms was originally approved for the 38th Field Artillery Battalion on 8 July 1941. It was redesignated for the 38th Artillery Regiment on 24 October 1958. The insignia was redesignated for the 38th Field Artillery Regiment effective 1 September 1971

Current configuration
 1st Battalion 38th Field Artillery Regiment (United States) 
 2nd Battalion 38th Field Artillery Regiment (United States)
 3rd Battalion 38th Field Artillery Regiment (United States)
 4th Battalion 38th Field Artillery Regiment (United States)
 5th Battalion 38th Field Artillery Regiment (United States)
 6th Battalion 38th Field Artillery Regiment (United States)

See also
 Field Artillery Branch (United States)

References

 https://web.archive.org/web/20110807085142/http://www.tioh.hqda.pentagon.mil/Heraldry/ArmyDUISSICOA/ArmyHeraldryUnit.aspx?u=3441

External links
 http://www.history.army.mil/html/forcestruc/lineages/branches/fa/default.htm

038
Military units and formations established in 1918